Statistics of Úrvalsdeild in the 1994 season.

Overview
It was contested by 10 teams, and ÍA won the championship. ÍA's Mihajlo Bibercic was the top scorer with 14 goals.

League standings

Results
Each team played every opponent once home and away for a total of 18 matches.

References

Úrvalsdeild karla (football) seasons
Iceland
Iceland
1994 in Icelandic football